Danny's Song is the seventh studio album by Canadian country pop artist Anne Murray, released in 1973 via Capitol Records. It was produced and arranged by Brian Ahern for Happy Sack Productions. Tracks 6–10 were recorded live at the National Arts Centre in Ottawa, Ontario. The album peaked at number 4 on the Billboard Country Albums chart and number 39 on the Billboard Pop Albums chart.

Track listing

Personnel 
 Anne Murray – lead vocals, backing vocals 
 Pat Riccio, Jr. – keyboards, backing vocals (6-10)
 Brian Ahern – guitars (1-5)
 Lenny Breau – guitars (6-10)
 Miles Wilkinson – guitars (6-10), backing vocals (6-10)
 Ben Keith – pedal steel guitar (1-5)
 Skip Beckwith – bass, horns 6-10)
 Andy Cree – drums, percussion
 Brent Titcomb – harmonica (1-5)
 Don Thompson – saxophone (6-10), flute (6-10), horns (6-10)
 Rick Wilkins – strings (1-5), horns (6-10)
 Terry Black – backing vocals (6-10)
 Dianne Brooks – backing vocals (6-10)
 Joanne Brooks – backing vocals (6-10)
 Brenda Gordon – backing vocals (6-10)
 Brian Russell – backing vocals (6-10)
 Laurel Ward – backing vocals (6-10)

Production 
 Brian Ahern – producer, arrangements, engineer 
 Paul White – A&R 
 Chris Skene – engineer 
 Miles Wilkinson – engineer 
 Don Newlands – photography

Charts

Weekly charts

Year-end charts

References

1973 albums
Anne Murray albums
Albums produced by Brian Ahern (producer)
Capitol Records albums